The 1981 National Panasonic Classic was a women's tennis tournament played on outdoor grass courts in Perth, Australia that was part of the Category 4 tier of the 1981 WTA Tour. It was the second edition of the tournament and was held from 16 November through 22 November 1981. Third-seeded Pam Shriver won the singles title and earned $22,000 first-prize money.

Finals

Singles
 Pam Shriver defeated  Andrea Jaeger 6–1, 7–6(7–4)
 It was Shriver's 1st singles title of the year and the 3rd of her career.

Doubles
 Barbara Potter /  Sharon Walsh defeated  Betsy Nagelsen /  Candy Reynolds 6–4, 6–2

Prize money

References

External links
 ITF tournament edition details

National Panasonic Classic
National Panasonic Open
National Panasonic Classic
National Panasonic Classic
National Panasonic Classic, 1981